Sona Rubenyan (born December 14, 1993) is an Armenian singer and songwriter. She is best known for winning the fifth edition of Hay Superstar.

Career
In 2011, Rubenyan became the winner of the fifth edition of Hay Superstar, which is the Armenian version of the British television hit show Pop Idol. In 2014, she also represented Armenia at the New Wave international contest in Jūrmala.

Since 2016, Rubenyan has been collaborating with Garik Papoyan as a duo under the name Garik & Sona, releasing several singles including "Lusin", "Esor Urbat e", "Nino" and more. In November 2020, amid the Nagorno-Karabakh war she was featured on a charity single titled "Mez vochinch chi haghti" (Nothing Will Win Us) along with Arthur Khachents, Iveta Mukuchyan, Gor Sujyan, Srbuk, Sevak Khanagyan and Sevak Amroyan.

Personal life
In December 2015, Rubenyan got engaged, but they broke up in 2016. In July 2021, she announced about her new engagement. They got married in November 2021.

Awards and achievements

References

1993 births
21st-century Armenian actresses
21st-century Armenian women  singers
Armenian Apostolic Christians
Armenian women singer-songwriters
Armenian pop singers
Hay Superstar participants
Living people
Musicians from Yerevan
Armenian folk-pop singers
Komitas State Conservatory of Yerevan alumni